Lake Millstatt (sometimes written "Millstättersee") is a lake in Carinthia, Austria.

Geography
It is situated at 588 metres above the Adriatic (1,929 ft), north of the Drava Valley within the Gurktal Alps (Nock Mountains) range of the Central Eastern Alps, near the town of Spittal an der Drau. With a surface area of  Lake Millstatt is the second largest lake of Carinthia (after Lake Wörth), though with a depth of  the most voluminous by far.  

Its steep shore gives the lake a fjord-like character. The Millstätter Alpe mountains in the north up to  protect it from cold winds, so the water temperature can reach  in summer.

The name derives from the market town Millstatt on the northern shore. Other municipalities near the lake are Seeboden and Radenthein-Döbriach. The shaded southern shore, a protected area since 1970, is almost uninhabited.

Geology
The lake arose in the last glacial (Würm) period, about 20,000 years ago, when a northern offset of the Drava glacier melted in situ and left dead-ice with extended fluvial deposits at its western rim damming meltwater. The continuous erosive downcutting by the discharge of the kettle into the Lieser River over the following millennia created a trench that considerably lowered the water level.

The Millstatt area is part of the Austroalpine nappes, consisting of gneiss and schists with quartzite deposits, which arose by the metamorphism of sand and clay minerals, probably in the Ordovician period. Higher reaches comprise garnet schists including several amphibole occurrences.

Limnology
Numerous brooks flow into the lake, of which the Riegerbach near Döbriach is the biggest. At the western end of the lake the short Seebach stream leads the water into the Lieser river, which itself is a tributary of the Drava. The oligotrophic lake with its deep basin has a large hypolimnic volume and meromictic waters, which are clear and reach drinking water quality.

Fishery, especially for trout, had been a source of food and work for residents since ancient times. Today sport fishing and angling is quite common not only for trout but also for several genera of carps, for wels catfish, northern pike, zander, perch and the European eel.

Transportation

Lake Millstatt can be reached via the Spittal-Millstättersee station of the Tauern Railway line with passenger train service provided by the Austrian Federal Railways (ÖBB). The B98 Millstätter Straße highway runs along the northern shore of the lake, connecting it with the Tauern Autobahn (A10) motorway from Salzburg to Villach (part of the European route E55) at the Spittal/Millstätter See junction.

Since 1901 ship transport on the lake in summer is provided by the Millstättersee Shipping Company, which today runs four vessels.

References

External links

 Carinthian Institute of Limnology
 Millstätter See Tourism Board

Lakes of Carinthia (state)
Mountain lakes
Kettle lakes in Austria